Chingari is a Pakistani black and white film directed by Khwaja Khurshid Anwar. It stars Shamim Ara and Santosh Kumar. Primarily known for its music, the film features song by Noor Jehan, Saleem Raza and Mehdi Hassan and lyrics by Qateel Shifai and Tanvir Naqvi. Released on 23 October 1964, the film performed average at the box office. It revolves around the clash between eastern and western civilizations. Chingari is one of the signature films of Anwar for which he wrote the story and composed the music also.

Plot

Cast 

 Shamim Ara
 Santosh Kumar
 Ejaz Durrani
 Deeba
 Komal
 Nighat Sultana
 Agha Talish
 Khursheed Shahid
 Nusrat Ara
 Nusrat Kardar

Soundtrack

Release and reception 

Chingari was countrywide released on 23 October 1964. It performed average at the box office.

References

External links 

 

1960s Urdu-language films
Urdu-language Pakistani films
Pakistani black-and-white films